
Gmina Krzęcin is a rural gmina (administrative district) in Choszczno County, West Pomeranian Voivodeship, in north-western Poland.

In 2006 its population was 3,810.

Villages
Gmina Krzęcin contains the villages and settlements of Boguszyce, Bukowno, Chłopowo, Gołąbki, Granówko, Granowo, Grzywacz, Kaszewo, Kolonia Czwarta, Kolonia Piąta, Krzęcin, Ligwiąca, Mielęcin, Nowy Klukom, Objezierze, Pluskocin, Potoczna, Prokolno, Przybysław, Putno, Rakowo, Roszkowice, Sierosławiec, Słonice, Smużyk, Sobieradz, Sobolewo, Sowiniec, Wężnik, Wydrzyn, Wyszyna and Żeńsko.

Neighbouring gminas
Gmina Krzęcin is bordered by the gminas of Bierzwnik, Choszczno, Pełczyce and Strzelce Krajeńskie.

References
Polish official population figures 2006

Krzecin
Choszczno County